The 2012 Ningbo Challenger was a professional tennis tournament played on hard courts. It was the second edition of the tournament (third for women) which was part of the 2012 ATP Challenger Tour and the 2012 ITF Women's Circuit. It took place in Ningbo, China, on 10–16 September 2012.

ATP entrants

Seeds 

 1 Rankings as of 27 August 2012

Other entrants 
The following players received wildcards into the singles main draw:
  Gao Xin
  Gong Maoxin
  Wang Chuhan
  Zhou Zhuo-Qing

The following players received entry from the qualifying draw:
  Jaan-Frederik Brunken
  Jeong Suk-Young
  Wang Ruikai
  Yi Chu-huan

WTA entrants

Seeds 

 1 Rankings as of 27 August 2012

Other entrants 
The following players received wildcards into the singles main draw:
  Han Xinyun
  Tang Haochen
  Xu Yifan
  Wang Yafan

The following players received entry from the qualifying draw:
  Liu Fangzhou
  Tetiana Luzhanska
  Yang Zhaoxuan
  Zhou Yimiao

The following players received entry by a Special Ranking:
  Zarina Diyas

Champions

Men's singles 

  Peter Gojowczyk def.  Jeong Suk-Young 6–3, 6–1

Women's singles 

  Hsieh Su-wei def.  Zhang Shuai 6–2, 6–2

Men's doubles 

  Sanchai Ratiwatana /  Sonchat Ratiwatana def.  Gong Maoxin /  Zhang Ze 6–4, 6–2

Women's doubles 

  Shuko Aoyama /  Chang Kai-chen def.  Tetiana Luzhanska /  Zheng Saisai 6–2, 7–5

External links 
 2012 Ningbo Challenger at ITFtennis.com

2012
2012 ATP Challenger Tour
2012 ITF Women's Circuit
2012 in Chinese tennis